The Certaldo Funicular is a funicular railway in the town of Certaldo, Tuscany, Italy. The line opened on 1 July 1999, and is operated by Tiemme Toscana Mobilità.

The funicular operates every 15 minutes. Services start at 07:30 and finish at a time between 19:30 and 01:00, depending on the time of year and day of the week.

The funicular has the following technical parameters:

See also 
 List of funicular railways

References

External links
 
 Funicular page on the Toscana Mobilità web site
 Video of the line from YouTube

Funicular railways in Italy
Railway lines opened in 1999
Railway lines in Tuscany
1999 establishments in Italy